Dughi Kola (also Romanized as Dūghī Kolā, Dūghī Kalā, and Dūghīkolā) is a village in Khoshk Rud Rural District, Rudbast District, Babolsar County, Mazandaran Province, Iran. At the 2006 census, its population was 611, in 157 families.

References 

Populated places in Babolsar County